Lais or Laïs may refer to one of the following:

Places
 Lais, Indonesia, a district in the Musi Banyuasin Regency in South Sumatra Province, Indonesia
 Lais River in Arjeplog Municipality, Sweden
 Lais (barony), a former barony and castle near Tartu, Estonia
 Dan (biblical city), Latin name for Laish, an earlier Biblical name for the city of Dan

People
 Lais of Corinth (fl. 425 BC), a courtesan
 Lais of Hyccara (fl. 385 BC), a courtesan
 Laïs (physician) (fl. 1st/2nd century BC), an ancient Greek midwife and physician
 The Lais of Marie de France
 Laís (footballer), Brazilian footballer

Other
 Laïs (band), a musical group
 Plural for Lai (poetic form)
 Breton lais, a form of British medieval romance literature
 Genus of flowering plants, now considered to be Hippeastrum